A. Carville Foster, Jr. (born October 21, 1932) is a former Republican member of the Pennsylvania House of Representatives.

References

Republican Party members of the Pennsylvania House of Representatives
Living people
1932 births
People from Parkton, Maryland